The Cordillera Blanca (Spanish for "white range") is a mountain range in Peru that is part of the larger Andes range and extends for  between 8°08' and 9°58'S and 77°00' and 77°52'W, in a northwesterly direction.

The Cordillera Blanca lies in the Ancash region and runs parallel to the Santa River valley (also called Callejón de Huaylas in its upper and midsections) on the west. Huascarán National Park, established in 1975, encompasses almost the entire range of the Cordillera Blanca.

Snowmelt from the Cordillera Blanca provides part of northern Peru with its year-round water supply, while 5% of Peru's power comes from a hydro-electrical plant located in the Santa River valley. The area of permanent ice cover shrank by about a third between the 1970s and 2006.

Geography 

The Cordillera Blanca is the most extensive tropical ice-covered mountain range in the world and has the largest concentration of ice in Peru. It is part of the Cordillera Occidental (the westernmost part of the Peruvian Andes), and trends in a northwesterly direction for 200 km between 8°08' and 9°58'S of latitude and 77°00' and 77°52' W of longitude. It has five of the most spectacular peaks above 6,000 m in the Peruvian Andes; the highest peak, Huascarán, rises to an elevation of 6,768 m above sea level. The Cordillera Blanca also acts as a continental divide: the Santa River on the west drains into the Pacific Ocean, whereas the Marañón River on the east drains into the Atlantic Ocean.

Glaciers 
Until the 1990s a total of 722 individual glaciers were recognized in this mountain range, covering an area of 723.4 km2. Most were on the western side of the range, where 530 glaciers covered an area of 507.5 km2, while on the eastern side 192 glaciers covered an area of 215.9 km2. Most of the glaciers, 91% of the total, were classified as mountain glaciers (they are generally short and have extremely steep slopes); the rest were classified as valley glaciers, except for one ice cap.

Like all Andean glaciers, the Cordillera Blanca has witnessed a major retreat of its glaciers during the 20th century due to global climate change. Studies have shown a retreat of over 15% since the 1970s. Based on analysis of satellite imagery, in 2003 there were 485 glaciers left, covering an area of 569.6 km2.

Lakes 
Among the most important lakes in the range are the Llanganuco Lakes, which are located on the northern side of Huascarán, and are accessible from the town of Yungay; the deep-turquoise Lake Parón (the biggest lake in the Cordillera Blanca), located just north of Huandoy, accessible from the town of Caraz; Lakes Ichiccocha and Jatuncocha, which are near Artesonraju and Alpamayo and are accessible only by trekking or on horseback from Caraz.

Some other notable lakes are Lake 69, Lake Allicocha, Lake Auquiscocha, Lake Palcacocha, Lake Querococha, and Lake Conococha.

Peaks 
There are several 6,000 m peaks in the Cordillera Blanca with a 400 m topographic prominence, and several other peaks over 5,500 m. Huascarán Sur, the highest, has two commonly quoted heights: 6,746 m from the Peruvian National Geographic Institute (IGN) map and 6,768 m from the Austrian Alpine Club (OeAV) survey map.
Some of the highest peaks in the Cordillera Blanca are listed below.

 Huascarán, 
 Huantsán, 
 Huandoy, 
 Chopicalqui, 
 Chinchey, 
 Palcaraju, 
 Santa Cruz, 
 Copa, 
 Ranrapalca, 
 Pucaranra, 
 Hualcán, 
 Chacraraju, 
 Pucajirca, 
 Quitaraju, 
 Tocllaraju, 
 Artesonraju, 
 Caraz, 
 Contrahierbas, 
 Alpamayo,  
 Ocshapalca, 
 Pirámide, 
 Ulta, 
 San Juan, 
 Taulliraju, 
 Santa Cruz Norte, 
 Rinrijirca, 
 Santa Cruz Chico, 
 Tullparaju, 
 Pisco, 
 Paccharaju, 	
 Champará, 
 Uruashraju, 
 Cayesh, 	
 Cashan, 
 Shacsha, 
 Rúrec, 
 Mururaju, 
 Vallunaraju, 
 Caullaraju, 
 Queshque, 	
 Jatuncunca, 
 Parón, 
 Perlilla, 
 Copap, 
 Jacabamba, 
 Andavite, 
 Millishraju, 
 Tantash, 	
 Carhuascancha, 
 Churup, 
 Challhua, 
 Tuco, 
 Pucagaga Punta, 
 Yanapaccha, 
 Kima Rumi, 
 Huamashraju, 
 Urus, 
 Huapi, 
 Milluacocha, 
 Rocotopunta, 	
 Raju Cutac, 	
 Pucaraju, 
 Tarushcancha, 	
 Tuctopunta, 	
 Pomabamba,  
 Maparaju, 	
 San Julián, 	
 Vicos, 	
 Carhuallún, 
 Chequiaraju, 
 Pilanco, 
 Rima Rima, 
 Tuctubamba, 
 Santón, 
 Yanamarey, 
 Tarush Huachanan, 	
 Pacra, 
 Sentilo, 
 Ichic Jeulla, 	
 Yanarrajo, 
 Pucaraju, 
 Arteza, 	
 Tuctu, 	
 Kunkush, 
 Cahuish, 	
 Gaico, 	
 Collpa Janca,

Hot springs 
Among the most important hot springs in the area are Monterrey and Chancos, which have been transformed into thermal bath facilities. They are 7 and 27 km respectively from the regional capital, Huaraz.

Climate 
The dry season extends from May through September, June and July having the least rain and more stable weather. The data on the chart correspond to the village of Musho (elevation: 3084 m), located at the foot of Huascarán.

Ecology 

Flora and fauna in the range have adapted to the climate and elevational range of mountainous areas. Almost all of the Cordillera Blanca is protected by Huascarán National Park.

Flora 
The main types of plant communities present in the area are the vegetation of inter-Andean valleys (xerophytic plants in the lower elevations and shrubs and grassland at the higher elevations) and high-altitude vegetation (Puna grasslands and patches of high Andean forest).

Plants in the range have adapted to the intense solar radiation, low temperatures, and water availability. Most plant species have pubescent leaves, an adaptation that protects the plants from water loss due to the intense solar radiation and low nighttime temperatures of the mountain climate.

Examples of typical vegetation of this area include Polylepis racemosa, Escallonia resinosa, Alnus acuminata, Senna birostris, Vallea stipularis, Lupinus spp., Vaccinium floribundum, Puya raimondii, Calamagrostis vicunarum, Festuca dolichophylla, Jarava ichu, Azorella spp., and Ranunculus macropetalus.

Fauna 
More than 120 bird species have been reported in Huascarán National Park. The most notable include the Andean condor, the torrent duck, the puna tinamou, the brown pintail, the Andean crested duck, the white-tufted grebe, the giant coot, and the Andean gull.

Among the mammals reported in the same area are the colocolo, the Andean mountain cat, the spectacled bear, the taruca deer, the vicuña, the white-tailed deer, the puma, the northern viscacha, the long-tailed weasel, the hog-nosed skunk, and the Andean fox.

See also

 Cordillera Blanca Fault Zone
 List of mountains in Peru
 List of first ascents in the Cordillera Blanca
 Cordillera Negra
 Huascarán National Park
 Cordillera Central (disambiguation)
 Ancash Region

References

External links

 Summitpost page on Cordillera Blanca
 Google Maps view of Cordillera Blanca
 Peak Lists for the Andes, including Peruvian Peaks

Mountain ranges of the Andes
Mountain ranges of Peru
Mountain ranges of Ancash Region
Huascarán National Park